Johan Christian Sergei Fabritius (born 29 May 1890 in Moscow; died 2 November 1946 in Helsinki) was a Finnish military lieutenant colonel.  

He received his military training mainly in St. Petersburg and served during the First World War in the Russian engineering troops and participated in several battles in East Prussia, the Carpathians and Galicia.  In 1917 he came to Finland and became chief of police in Rauma. In 1918, he commanded the White Guard on Åland and was later battalion commander in Satakunta.

In 1919 he was head of the fortifications department of the Ministry of War and from 1935 to 1938 acting head of the general staff's fortification department. He planned a large part of the fortifications that were built on the eastern border, Ladoga and the coast of the Gulf of Finland during the interwar period. That is why he has been called "the father of the Mannerheim line".

Fabritius was politically active in the Finnish-Swedish National Socialist circles before and during World War II. After Finland's armistice with the Soviet Union, in January 1945 he made a trip with a submarine to Germany. Lauri Törni was in same submarine. After negotiations with Ernst Kaltenbrunner between 10 and 11 February, he flew back and parachuted on 21 February. After being captured by the Red State Police, he died under observation in hospital.

Books
 . Schildts, Helsinki 1921, Finnish title . Otava 1921.
 . . Schildts, Helsinki 1922, Finnish title . Otava 1922.
 . Helsinki 1924, Finnish title . Otava 1924.
 . Söderström, Helsinki 1932.
 . Söderström, Helsinki 1936, Finnish title : novel. Otava 1938.
 . Söderström, Helsinki 1945.

Sources
Cronwall, Marjatta: . tutkiva.fi. 22 March 2000. Tutkivan journalismin yhdistys. Archived 13 January 2006. Accessed 21 March 2020.
Pohjonen, Juha: . Helsinki: Otava, 2000. .
Salo, Paavo: "Sonderkommando Nord" – . 2005. Salo, Paavo. Archived 10 August 2016. Accessed 21 March 2020.
Uitto, Antero & Geust, Carl-Fredrik: . Ajatus Kirjat, 2006. .
Harjula, Mirko: . Helsinki: Books on Demand, 2010. .
Uola, Mikko: . Helsinki: Minerva Kustannus Oy, 2013. .
Silvennoinen, Oula & Tikka, Marko & Roselius, Aapo: . Helsinki: WSOY, 2016. .

References

1890 births
1946 deaths
Military personnel from Moscow
Finnish military personnel
Finnish Nazis
People of the Finnish Civil War (White side)
People of World War I
Nazis from outside Germany